Time Being is the tenth studio album by Ron Sexsmith, released in 2006.  It was produced by Mitchell Froom.

Track listing
All songs written by Ronald Eldon Sexsmith.

"Hands of Time" - 3:16
"Snow Angel" - 3:54
"All in Good Time" - 3:35
"Never Give Up" -  3:41
"I Think We're Lost" - 2:57
"Reason for Our Love" - 3:10
"Cold Hearted Wind" - 3:40
"Jazz at the Bookstore" - 3:29
"Ship of Fools" - 3:10
"The Grim Trucker" - 2:59
"Some Dusty Things" - 2:38
"And Now the Day Is Done" - 4:21
"Snow Angel (Live)" (Japanese Bonus Track) 
"And Now The Day Is Done (Live)" (Japanese Bonus Track) 
"Jazz At The Bookstore (Live)" (Japanese Bonus Track) 
"Ship Of Fools (Live)" (Japanese Bonus Track)

References

2006 albums
Ron Sexsmith albums
Albums produced by Mitchell Froom
V2 Records albums